The 75 mm M.27 was a Norwegian mountain gun used in World War II. Twenty-four of these guns were designed and built by Kongsberg Kanonfabrik to supplement the old 75mm Ehrhardt M.11 guns. There is no record of any use by Nazi Germany after the Norwegian Campaign

References

 Chamberlain, Peter & Gander, Terry. Infantry, Mountain and Airborne Guns.

World War II mountain artillery
World War II artillery of Norway
World War II field artillery
75 mm artillery